The 1949–50 season was Port Vale's 38th season of football in the English Football League, and their fifth full season in the Third Division South. It was the last season to be played at The Old Recreation Ground – despite numerous clashes with the authorities over the construction of the new stadium. The sale of Ronnie Allen raised a massive £20,000.

Overview

Third Division South
The pre-season saw the arrival of experienced full-back Lol Hamlett from Bolton Wanderers, and young keeper Ray King from Leyton Orient (brother of George). On his arrival King stated that The Old Recreation Ground was like 'some shanty town out west' and compared the dressing room to 'a dungeon', despite which somehow he 'felt completely at home'. The playing staff now stood at 59 amateurs and 27 full-time professionals.

The season opened with a 1–0 win over Bristol Rovers, which was followed by a 1–0 reverse to Southend United at Roots Hall three days later. This loss was thanks to an own goal from Garth Butler, who put the ball into his own net despite being some distance from any Southend players. A seven match unbeaten run followed, built upon a defence that leaked just five goals, King and Hamlett settling in well. Bad news off the field returned however, when Stoke-on-Trent City Council rejected the club's application to move two stands from The Old Rec to the new stadium. As a result, the club set up a 100,000 Shilling Fund to build the two stands from scratch. On the pitch results began to turn against the "Valiants", and so striker Cliff Pinchbeck was signed from Brighton & Hove Albion for a £3,500 fee. Pinchbeck marked his debut with a hat-trick over Millwall, receiving a standing ovation from his new fans. More off-field stadium troubles came when the Regional Officer of the Minister of Works refused a licence for the stadium on unspecified grounds. Club officials were forced to travel to London to discuss the matter with the minister, eventually convincing him to change his mind. The home match with Newport County on 15 October was notable as the first Vale match to offer a matchday programme.

A successful Christmas period took Vale into sixth place by mid-February. George King was then sold to Barrow for a four-figure fee, after which Pinchbeck was the only regular scorer. Six games without a win followed, ending the club's hopes of opening the new stadium in the Second Division. The Shilling Fund had only raised 17,738 shillings, and so Ronnie Allen was sold to top-flight West Bromwich Albion for a massive £20,000, smashing the club's transfer record. Allen went on to play for England, whilst the fee went towards the new ground. Back to the league, the Vale were seventh at the start of April, but six defeats in their final eight games saw them tumble down the table.

They finished in thirteenth place with 41 points. The defence was the third strongest in the division, however only Watford scored fewer goals. Pinchbeck was the only goalscorer of any consistency.

Finances
On the financial side, a profit of £10,671 was made, another record, this was due to the sale of Allen which gave them a transfer credit of £15,000. The wage bill had risen by £6,000 to £22,333, whereas gate receipts had risen by around £3,000 to £29,050. Eric Eastwood was the only major departure of the summer. Trouble with the new ground continued, as the Regional Officer of the Ministry of Works refused to permit the transfer of the stand from the old to the new stadium, despite having approved similar procedures at Liverpool and Millwall. Chairman William Holdcroft felt this was unfair, and was supported by Stoke-on-Trent North MP Albert Davies. Despite this set-back the stadium was opened on 2 August in a ceremony attended by 12,000 rain-soaked people.

Cup competitions
In the FA Cup, Vale progressed past Athenian League amateurs Wealdstone and Tranmere Rovers of the Third Division North with 1–0 home wins. Beating Newport County at Somerton Park with a Ronnie Allen brace, they came up against First Division Burnley in the Fourth Round at Turf Moor. There they lost 2–1 in front of 49,692 spectators – 12,000 of which were Vale fans.

League table

Results
Port Vale's score comes first

Football League Third Division South

Results by matchday

Matches

FA Cup

Player statistics

Appearances

Top scorers

Transfers

Transfers in

Transfers out

References
Specific

General

Port Vale F.C. seasons
Port Vale